Clyde Franklin Kluttz (December 12, 1917 – May 12, 1979) was an American professional baseball player, scout and front-office executive. In Major League Baseball, Kluttz was a catcher for the Boston Braves (1942–45), New York Giants (1945–46), St. Louis Cardinals (1946), Pittsburgh Pirates (1947–48), St. Louis Browns (1951) and Washington Senators (1951–52).

Born in nearby Rockwell, he was a longtime resident of Salisbury, North Carolina, where he attended Catawba College. His 17-year playing career began in 1938.  Kluttz appeared in 52 regular season games as a member of the  world champion Cardinals—and was the starting catcher on October 3 for the flag-clinching Game 2 of the postseason playoff against the Brooklyn Dodgers—but he did not play in the 1946 World Series.

In nine Major League seasons, Kluttz played in 656 games, and had 1,903 at-bats, 172 runs, 510 hits, 90 doubles, 8 triples, 19 home runs, 212 RBI, 5 stolen bases, 132 walks, .268 batting average, .318 on-base percentage, .354 slugging percentage, 673 total bases and 30 sacrifice hits.

Kluttz was a longtime scout after his playing days ended, working with the Kansas City Athletics and New York Yankees.  He was credited with signing Baseball Hall of Famer Catfish Hunter, a fellow North Carolinian, for the Athletics in 1964, and, 11 years later, while serving as the Yankees' scouting director (1974–75), he played a key role in convincing free agent Hunter to join the Yankees. Kluttz resigned from the Yankees and was reunited with friend and Athletics colleague Hank Peters as director of player development with the Baltimore Orioles on January 7, 1976. He served in that capacity from 1976 until his 1979 death, in Salisbury, at age 61 from kidney and heart ailments.

References

Sources

External links

 

1917 births
1979 deaths
Baltimore Orioles executives
Baltimore Orioles (IL) players
Baseball executives
Baseball players from North Carolina
Boston Braves players
Columbus Red Birds players
Decatur Commodores players
Indianapolis Indians players
Johnson City Soldiers players
Kansas City Athletics scouts
Kilgore Boomers players
Major League Baseball catchers
Major League Baseball farm directors
Major League Baseball scouting directors
New York Giants (NL) players
New York Yankees executives
New York Yankees scouts
People from Salisbury, North Carolina
Pittsburgh Pirates players
Sacramento Solons players
St. Louis Browns players
St. Louis Cardinals players
Savannah A's players
Washington Senators (1901–1960) players